Welaunee Plantation was a cotton plantation near Wacissa in Jefferson County, Florida, established by Col. Robert Howard Gamble.

History
Welaunee Plantation was established in 1826 when Robert Gamble brought his family to Florida. Robert's brother, John Grattan Gamble, established Waukeenah Plantation next to Welaunee. 
From 1838, Fort Welaunee became a settlers' fort on the Welaunee Plantation near Wacissa. Later this was Fort Gamble and operated from 1839 to 1843. 

Robert Howard Gamble was born in Grove Hill, Botetourt County, Virginia in 1815, the son of son of Captain Robert Gamble of Revolutionary War fame. His mother was General James Breckenridge's daughter Letitia who ignored the matrimonial offerings of Captain Meriwether Lewis.

Gamble commanded what was known as Gamble's artillery in the American Civil War. Soldiers from Leon County, Florida served in it. Frederick L. Villepigue became a Captain under Gamble. Gamble became a Colonel.

His command took part in the Battle of Olustee.

Resources
cstone.net

References

Plantations in Jefferson County, Florida
Cotton plantations in Florida
1826 establishments in Florida Territory